One Day is a 2017 South Korean drama film directed by Lee Yoon-ki and starring Kim Nam-gil and Chun Woo-hee. The film was released on April 5, 2017.

Premise
The film tells the story of a newly widowed insurance investigator who is handling the case of a woman who goes into a coma after a car accident. He encounters the spirit of the woman when he visits her in hospital one day, and realizes that he is the only person who can see her.

Cast

 Kim Nam-gil as Lee Kang-soo
 Chun Woo-hee as Dan Mi-so
 Lim Hwa-young as Sun-hwa
 Jung Sun-kyung as Dan Mi-so's mother
 Park Hee-von as Park Ho-jung
 Jung Soon-won as Bum-jin
 Kim Ye-joon as Choi Ji-ho
 Kim Jung-hyun as Assistant manager Cha
 Lee Soo-in as Assistant manager Lee
 Nam Young-sun as Manager Park
 Lee Seung-yeon as Nurse Soo
 Jun Yoo-rim as Jin-young
 Baek Sang-hee as Bartender
 Kim Byung-soon as Sun-hwa's father
 Lee Ji-hoon as Dan Mi-so's doctor
 Jun Han-na as Dan Mi-so's nurse
 Kang Sook as Dan Mi-so's caregiver
 Park Jung-mi as Marriage officiant

Cameo appearance
 Yoon Je-moon as Choi Doo-yong
 Kim Hye-ok as Sun-hwa's mother
 Sung Joon as Young-woo
 Lee Mi-so as
 Kim Young-min as
 Kim Joong-gi as Kim Man-bok
 Shin Young-jin as Kim Man-bok's wife

Production
Filming began on April 12, 2016, and concluded on July 8, 2016.

Awards and nominations

References

External links

One Day at Naver Movies 

2017 films
2010s Korean-language films
South Korean fantasy drama films
2010s fantasy drama films
Films directed by Lee Yoon-ki
2017 drama films
2010s South Korean films